The structural similarity index measure (SSIM) is a method for predicting the perceived quality of digital television and cinematic pictures, as well as other kinds of digital images and videos.  SSIM is used for measuring the similarity between two images. The SSIM index is a full reference metric; in other words, the measurement or prediction of image quality is based on an initial uncompressed or distortion-free image as reference.

SSIM is a perception-based model that considers image degradation as perceived change in structural information, while also incorporating important perceptual phenomena, including both luminance masking and contrast masking terms.  The difference with other techniques such as MSE or PSNR is that these approaches estimate absolute errors.  Structural information is the idea that the pixels have strong inter-dependencies especially when they are spatially close. These dependencies carry important information about the structure of the objects in the visual scene. Luminance masking is a phenomenon whereby image distortions (in this context) tend to be less visible in bright regions, while contrast masking is a phenomenon whereby distortions become less visible where there is significant activity or "texture" in the image.

History 
The predecessor of SSIM was called Universal Quality Index (UQI), or Wang–Bovik Index, which was developed by Zhou Wang and Alan Bovik in 2001. This evolved, through their collaboration with Hamid Sheikh and Eero Simoncelli, into the current version of SSIM, which was published in April 2004 in the IEEE Transactions on Image Processing. In addition to defining the SSIM quality index, the paper provides a general context for developing and evaluating perceptual quality measures, including connections to human visual neurobiology and perception, and direct validation of the index against human subject ratings.

The basic model was developed in the Laboratory for Image and Video Engineering (LIVE) at The University of Texas at Austin and further developed jointly with the Laboratory for Computational Vision (LCV) at New York University. Further variants of the model have been developed in the Image and Visual Computing Laboratory at University of Waterloo and have been commercially marketed.

SSIM subsequently found strong adoption in the image processing community and in the television and social media industries. The 2004 SSIM paper has been cited over 40,000 times according to Google Scholar, making it one of the highest cited papers in the image processing and video engineering fields. It was recognized with the IEEE Signal Processing Society Best Paper Award for 2009. It also received the IEEE Signal Processing Society Sustained Impact Award for 2016, indicative of a paper having an unusually high impact for at least 10 years following its publication. Because of its high adoption by the television industry, the authors of the original SSIM paper were each accorded a Primetime Engineering Emmy Award in 2015 by the Television Academy.

Algorithm 
The SSIM index is calculated on various windows of an image.

with:
 ,  two variables to stabilize the division with weak denominator;
  the dynamic range of the pixel-values (typically this is );

Formula components 
The individual comparison functions are:

with, in addition to above definitions: 
 
SSIM is then a weighted combination of those comparative measures:

Setting the weights  to 1, the formula can be reduced to the form shown above.

Mathematical Properties 
SSIM satisfies the identity of indiscernibles, and symmetry properties, but not the triangle inequality or non-negativity, and thus is not a distance function. However, under certain conditions, SSIM may be converted to a normalized root MSE measure, which is a distance function. The square of such a function is not convex, but is locally convex and quasiconvex, making SSIM a feasible target for optimization.

Application of the formula 
In order to evaluate the image quality, this formula is usually applied only on luma, although it may also be applied on color (e.g., RGB) values or chromatic (e.g. YCbCr) values. The resultant SSIM index is a decimal value between -1 and 1, where 1 indicates perfect similarity, 0 indicates no similarity, and -1 indicates perfect anti-correlation. For an image, it is typically calculated using a sliding Gaussian window of size 11x11 or a block window of size 8×8. The window can be displaced pixel-by-pixel on the image to create an SSIM quality map of the image. In the case of video quality assessment, the authors propose to use only a subgroup of the possible windows to reduce the complexity of the calculation.

Variants

Multi-Scale SSIM 
A more advanced form of SSIM, called Multiscale SSIM (MS-SSIM) is conducted over multiple scales through a process of multiple stages of sub-sampling, reminiscent of multiscale processing in the early vision system. It has been shown to perform equally well or better than SSIM on different subjective image and video databases.

Multi-component SSIM 
 (3-SSIM) is a form of SSIM that takes into account the fact that the human eye can see differences more precisely on textured or edge regions than on smooth regions. The resulting metric is calculated as a weighted average of SSIM for three categories of regions: edges, textures, and smooth regions. The proposed weighting is 0.5 for edges, 0.25 for the textured and smooth regions. The authors mention that a 1/0/0 weighting (ignoring anything but edge distortions) leads to results that are closer to subjective ratings. This suggests that edge regions play a dominant role in image quality perception.

The authors of 3-SSIM have also extended the model into  (4-SSIM). The edge types are further subdivided into preserved and changed edges by their distortion status. The proposed weighting is 0.25 for all four components.

Structural Dissimilarity 
Structural dissimilarity (DSSIM) may be derived from SSIM, though it does not constitute a distance function as the triangle inequality is not necessarily satisfied.

Video quality metrics and temporal variants 
It is worth noting that the original version SSIM was designed to measure the quality of still images. It does not contain any parameters directly related to temporal effects of human perception and human judgment. A common practice is to calculate the average SSIM value over all frames in the video sequence. However, several temporal variants of SSIM have been developed.

Complex Wavelet SSIM 
The complex wavelet transform variant of the SSIM (CW-SSIM) is designed to deal with issues of image scaling, translation and rotation. Instead of giving low scores to images with such conditions, the CW-SSIM takes advantage of the complex wavelet transform and therefore yields higher scores to said images. The CW-SSIM is defined as follows:

Additionally,  is a small positive number used for the purposes of function stability. Ideally, it should be zero. Like the SSIM, the CW-SSIM has a maximum value of 1. The maximum value of 1 indicates that the two signals are perfectly structurally similar while a value of 0 indicates no structural similarity.

SSIMPLUS 
The SSIMPLUS index is based on SSIM and is a commercially available tool. It extends SSIM's capabilities, mainly to target video applications. It provides scores in the range of 0–100, linearly matched to human subjective ratings. It also allows adapting the scores to the intended viewing device, comparing video across different resolutions and contents.

According to its authors, SSIMPLUS achieves higher accuracy and higher speed than other image and video quality metrics. However, no independent evaluation of SSIMPLUS has been performed, as the algorithm itself is not publicly available.

cSSIM 
In order to further investigate the standard discrete SSIM from a theoretical perspective, the continuous SSIM (cSSIM) has been introduced and studied in the context of Radial basis function interpolation.

Other simple modifications 
The r* cross-correlation metric is based on the variance metrics of SSIM. It's defined as  when ,  when both standard deviations are zero, and  when only one is zero. It has found use in analyzing human response to contrast-detail phantoms.

SSIM has also been used on the gradient of images, making it "G-SSIM". G-SSIM is especially useful on blurred images.

The modifications above can be combined. For example, 4-G-r* is a combination of 4-SSIM, G-SSIM, and r*. It is able to reflect radiologist preference for images much better than other SSIM variants tested.

Application 
SSIM has applications in a variety of different problems.  Some examples are:

 Image Compression: In lossy image compression, information is deliberately discarded to decrease the storage space of images and video. The MSE is typically used in such compression schemes. According to its authors, using SSIM instead of MSE is suggested to produce better results for the decompressed images.
The traditional filter which is used to solve this problem is the Wiener Filter. However, the Wiener filter design is based on the MSE. Using an SSIM variant, specifically Stat-SSIM, is claimed to produce better visual results, according to the algorithm's authors.
 Pattern Recognition: Since SSIM mimics aspects of human perception, it could be used for recognizing patterns. When faced with issues like image scaling, translation and rotation, the algorithm's authors claim that it is better to use CW-SSIM, which is insensitive to these variations and may be directly applied by template matching without using any training sample. Since data-driven pattern recognition approaches may produce better performance when a large amount of data is available for training, the authors suggest using CW-SSIM in data-driven approaches.

Performance comparison
Due to its popularity, SSIM is often compared to other metrics, including more simple metrics such as MSE and PSNR, and other perceptual image and video quality metrics. SSIM has been repeatedly shown to significantly outperform MSE and its derivates in accuracy, including research by its own authors and others.

A paper by Dosselmann and Yang claims that the performance of SSIM is "much closer to that of the MSE" than usually assumed. While they do not dispute the advantage of SSIM over MSE, they state an analytical and functional dependency between the two metrics. According to their research, SSIM has been found to correlate as well as MSE-based methods on subjective databases other than the databases from SSIM's creators. As an example, they cite Reibman and Poole, who found that MSE outperformed SSIM on a database containing packet-loss–impaired video. In another paper, an analytical link between PSNR and SSIM was identified.

See also
 Mean squared error
 Peak signal-to-noise ratio
 Video quality

References

External links
 Home page
 Rust Implementation
 C/C++ Implementation
 DSSIM C++ Implementation
 Chris Lomont's C# Implementation
 qpsnr implementation (multi threaded C++)
 Implementation in VQMT software
 Implementation in Python
 "Mystery Behind Similarity Measures MSE and SSIM", Gintautas Palubinskas, 2014

Image processing